Sara bint Faisal Al Saud ( Sara bint Fayṣal Āl Su'ūd; born 1935) is a member of the House of Saud, the Saudi royal family. She was among the first female members of the Consultative Assembly of Saudi Arabia who served in the post between January 2013 and December 2016.

Early life and education
Sara bint Faisal is the eldest child of King Faisal and Iffat Al Thunayan who was of Turkish descent. She was born in 1935. Her full-siblings include Prince Mohammad, Princess Latifa, Prince Saud, Prince Abdul Rahman, Prince Bandar, Prince Turki, Princess Lolowah and Princess Haifa.

Sara bint Faisal learned Turkish language from her mother during her childhood. She graduated from Wellesley College.

Career and activities

Princess Sara and her sister Princess Latifa established one of the first charitable organizations in Saudi Arabia, Al Nahda, in 1962. Princess Sara has been the chair of the organization since then. The organization was awarded the first Chaillot prize for human rights organizations in the Arab states of the Persian Gulf in 2009. She also established the private Al Tarbeya Al Islamiya Schools in Riyadh in 1964. As of 2009 she was the chair of Effat University's board of founders and board of trustees. She is also chair of Riyadh-based Art of Heritage organization. In addition, she serves as member of the various organizations, including Maharat Center.

Princess Sara was named as a member of the Consultative Assembly on 11 January 2013. She was one of the first two royal women appointed to the assembly along with Moudi bint Khalid, daughter of King Khalid. Tenure of both royal women ended in December 2016 when King Salman appointed new members to the assembly.

Personal life
Sara bint Faisal is the widow of Mohammad bin Saud, son of King Saud. They had no children.

Honors
In May 2013, Princess Sara was awarded King Abdulaziz Medal of First Class for her activities.

References

Sara
Sara
1935 births
Child welfare activism
Sara
Living people
Sara
Sara
Sara
Sara
Wellesley College alumni
Women philanthropists